Brachycaudus is a genus of aphids of the family Aphididae.

References

Sternorrhyncha genera
Macrosiphini